CRHS is a four-letter acronym that may refer to a high school or health care system:
Canyon Ridge High School in Twin Falls, Idaho, United States
Centennial Regional High School in Greenfield Park, Quebec, Canada
Central Regional High School in Berkeley Township, New Jersey, United States
Charlottetown Rural High School in Charlottetown, Prince Edward Island, Canada
Cinco Ranch High School in Katy, Texas, United States
Cedar Ridge High school in Round Rock, Texas, United States
Coginchaug Regional High School in Durham, Connecticut, United States 
Columbia River High School in Vancouver, Washington, United States
Coon Rapids High School in Coon Rapids, Minnesota, United States
Coral Reef High School in Richmond Heights, Florida, United States
Cossatot River High School in Polk County, Arkansas
Crystal River High School in Crystal River, Florida, United States
Cumberland Regional High School in Cumberland County, New Jersey, United States
Columbus Regional Healthcare System in Muscogee County, Georgia, United States